Jeremy Vernon Coney  (born 21 June 1952) is a former New Zealand cricketer and current cricket commentator. An all-rounder, between 1974 and 1987 he played 52 Test matches and 88 One Day Internationals (ODIs) for New Zealand, of which he was captain in 15 Tests and 25 ODIs.

International career
He was one of New Zealand's most successful batsmen, at least by average, and he made 16 fifties, but centuries often eluded him and he had to wait nine years to make his first – by that time, he had turned 31. He only lost one Test series as captain, against Pakistan away, and he became a Wisden Cricketer of the Year in 1984.

Coney was the captain who in 1986, after the England wicketkeeper Bruce French was injured by a Hadlee bouncer, allowed Bob Taylor to leave the sponsor's tent and play as a substitute. New Zealand won that series with the bowling of Richard Hadlee only slightly more potent than the captaincy of Coney. His medium-pace bowling was often used in ODIs, where it yielded 54 wickets, including four for 46 against Sri Lanka in 1985.

Beyond cricket
During his playing days, Coney's height, reach, and reactions as a slip fieldsman, earned him the nickname "The Mantis". He wrote Playing Mantis: An Autobiography in 1986. Along with John Parker and Bryan Waddle, he wrote The Wonderful Days of Summer in 1993.

In the 1986 Queen's Birthday Honours, Coney was appointed a Member of the Order of the British Empire, for services to cricket. In 1990, he was awarded the New Zealand 1990 Commemoration Medal.

In 2001 he made a television documentary series, The Mantis and the Cricket: Tales from the Tours, which looked back on New Zealand's cricket history, using interviews with former players and historical footage. The first part follows the 1937 New Zealand Cricket team which toured England with interviews of Walter Hadlee, Merv Wallace, Jack Kerr and Lindsay Weir.

He now lives in south Oxfordshire and works as a commentator/summariser for Sky TV and Test Match Special, where he is noted for his regular use of the word "parsimonious". Coney is trained as a stage lighting designer; in 2008 he lit I Found My Horn, a solo play which has enjoyed runs at the Tristan Bates and the Hampstead theatres.

References

External links

New Zealand cricketers
New Zealand One Day International captains
New Zealand Test cricket captains
New Zealand Test cricketers
Wellington cricketers
New Zealand One Day International cricketers
Cricketers at the 1979 Cricket World Cup
Cricketers at the 1983 Cricket World Cup
Wisden Cricketers of the Year
New Zealand cricket commentators
1952 births
Living people
New Zealand Members of the Order of the British Empire
People educated at Onslow College
Radio Sport
North Island cricketers